David Arthur Francis (born 29 November 1953) is a former Welsh cricketer. Francis was a right-handed batsman who bowled right-arm off break. He was born at Clydach, Glamorgan. In the field he was able to throw the ball equally well with either arm.

References

External links
Arthur Francis at ESPNcricinfo
Arthur Francis at CricketArchive

1953 births
Living people
Cricketers from Swansea
Welsh cricketers
Glamorgan cricketers
Wales National County cricketers